Maria LaRosa is an American meteorologist. Since July 2019, she has worked as a meteorologist on WNBC-TV New York and is a substitute weather presenter on NBC's Today.

Previously, she worked for The Weather Channel in Atlanta, Georgia. She co-hosted America's Morning Headquarters with Sam Champion and Mike Bettes from 2014 to 2015. She hosted Weekend Recharge with Paul Goodloe until September 23, 2018.

Early life and career
LaRosa was born in New York state, but was raised in Ramsey, New Jersey. In June 2004, she joined KYW-TV in Philadelphia, Pennsylvania. She was later hired by WXIX-TV, the Fox Broadcasting Company station in Cincinnati, Ohio. She was the weekday morning and noon meteorologist for KYW-TV in Philadelphia. She was a meteorologist and presenter for WTVM-TV, the ABC station in Columbus, Georgia. In 2010, she joined The Weather Channel and became an on-camera meteorologist for both Weekend Now and PM Edition with her co-host Todd Santos. In March 2012, she left to do the 5:30 to 6:00am edition of First Outlook and Your Weather Today from 9:00 to 10:00am (EST).

She hosted Wake Up With Al from 5:30 tto 7am with Stephanie Abrams, Al Roker and Mike Bettes (2012–2014), Morning Rush from 7 to 10am with Abrams and Bettes (2010–2014), and America's Morning Headquarters (2014–2015). Her last day on The Weather Channel was September 23, 2018.

Career timeline
1998–2000: WTVM-TV meteorologist
2000–2004: WXIX
2004–2010: KYW-TV weekday morning and noon meteorologist
2010–2018: The Weather Channel
2010–2012: Weekend Now co-presenter
2010–2012: PM Edition Weekend co-presenter
2012: First Outlook co-presenter
2012: Your Weather Today co-presenter/fill-in 
2012–2014: Morning Rush co-presenter/fill-in
2012–2014: Wake Up With Al segment correspondent/fill-in
2014–2015: America's Morning Headquarters co-presenter
2015–2018: Weekend Recharge co-host/Weather Center Live fill-in
 2019–present: NBC
 2019–present: WNBC meteorologist - Today in New York
 2019–present: Weekend Today/NBC News fill-in weather presenter

Education
LaRosa graduated in 1998 from Penn State University with a Bachelor of Science degree in meteorology. She was also a teaching assistant for the University's introductory meteorology course before graduating in 1998.

She is a member of the National Weather Association and the American Meteorological Society (AMS). She holds a seal of approval as a certified broadcasting meteorologist.

Personal life
She once lived in South Jersey with her husband, Mariusz Kolakowski. They have three sons: Michael (born in 2005), Justin (born in 2008) and Tyler (born May 3, 2010).

References

External links
 Maria LaRosa - The Weather Channel
 Press releases - The Weather Channel
 

Living people
Philadelphia television reporters
American television meteorologists
Weather presenters
People from Ramsey, New Jersey
The Weather Channel people
1976 births